The shock-headed capuchin (Cebus cuscinus) is a species of gracile capuchin monkey from Bolivia and Peru.  It was previously classified as a subspecies of the Humboldt's white-fronted capuchin (C. albifrons), but in 2013 Mittermeier and Rylands elevated it to a separate species, following genetic studies by Boubli et al. in 2012 and Lynch Alfaro et al. in 2010.

References

Capuchin monkeys
Mammals of Peru
Mammals of Bolivia
Mammals described in 1901
Taxa named by Oldfield Thomas
Primates of South America